Juan Ibacache Pizarro (1 May 1903 – 3 August 1979) was a Chilean footballer. He competed in the men's tournament at the 1928 Summer Olympics.

References

External links
 

1903 births
1979 deaths
Chilean footballers
Chile international footballers
Olympic footballers of Chile
Footballers at the 1928 Summer Olympics
Association football goalkeepers
Magallanes footballers